Jeremy Sutherland Begbie, BA, BD, PhD, LRAM, ARCM,  (born 1957) is Thomas A. Langford Distinguished Research Professor of Theology at Duke Divinity School, Duke University, where he directs Duke Initiatives in Theology and the Arts. He is a systematic theologian whose primary research interest is the correlation between theology and the arts, in particular the interplay between music and theology. He is also an Affiliated Lecturer in the Faculty of Music at the University of Cambridge.

Biography 
Begbie was born on 15 June 1957. He obtained a Bachelor of Arts degree in philosophy and music at the University of Edinburgh and Bachelor of Divinity and Doctor of Philosophy degree at the University of Aberdeen.

Prior to teaching at Duke Divinity School in 2009, he was the Associate Principal of Ridley Hall, Cambridge, as well as an Affiliated Lecturer in the Faculty of Divinity, University of Cambridge. In addition, he was an Honorary Professor at the Institute for Theology, Imagination, and the Arts at St Mary's College, University of St Andrews, in Scotland, and was the acting Associate Director of the program. He is currently Thomas A. Langford Distinguished Research Professor of Theology at Duke University. He is a Senior Member of Wolfson College, Cambridge.

He is an ordained minister at the Church of England.

Being a professionally trained musician, he has performed as a pianist, oboist, and a conductor. He is founder of the New Caritas Orchestra, a group professional players of faith.

Research 
He is known for his writing and lecturing in theology and the arts, especially music.

In September 1997 he founded the Theology Through the Arts project at the University of Cambridge, whose primary aim was "to discover and demonstrate ways in which the arts can contribute towards the renewal of Christian theology". The project included conversation among artists and theologians, academic lectures, publications, and an international arts festival held in 2000.

In 2009, he founded Duke Initiatives in Theology and the Arts (DITA) at Duke Divinity School, a project which "promotes and supports the vibrant interplay between Christian theology and the arts by encouraging transformative leadership and enriching theological discussion in the Church, academy, and society."

For his book, Resounding Truth: Christian Wisdom in the World of Music, Begbie won the 2008 Christianity Today Book Award in the theology/ethics category.

Publications

Books
Voicing Creation's Praise: Towards A Theology of the Arts, T&T Clark, 1991.
Beholding the Glory: Incarnation Through the Arts (ed.), DLT/Baker Books, 2000.
Theology, Music, and Time, Cambridge University Press, 2000.
Sounding the Depths: Theology Through the Arts (ed.), SCM Press, 2002.
Resounding Truth: Christian Wisdom in the World of Music, Baker Academic, 2007.
Resonant Witness: Conversations Between Theology and Music (co ed.), Eerdmans, 2011.
Art, Imagination and Christian Hope: Patterns of Promise (co ed.), Ashgate, 2012.
Music, Modernity, and God, Oxford University Press, 2013.
Redeeming Transcendence: Bearing Witness to the Triune God, Eerdmans, 2018.
A Peculiar Orthodoxy: Reflections on Theology and the Arts, Baker Academic, 2018
Theology, Music, and Modernity: Struggles for Freedom, (co ed.), Oxford University Press, 2021.
Abundantly More: Theology and the Arts in a Reductionist World, Baker Academic, 2023 (forthcoming).

Selected articles

 "Who Is This God?--Biblical Inspiration Revisited.” Tyndale Bulletin 43, 2 (November 1992): 259-282.
 "The Theological Potential of Music: A Response to Adrienne Dengerink Chaplin.” Christian Scholar's Review 33, 1 (Fall 2003): 135-141.
“On the Strange Place of Contemporary Art,” article review of On the Strange Place of Religion in Contemporary Art, James Elkins (New York: Routledge, 2004) and God in the Gallery: A Christian Embrace of Modern Art, Daniel Siedell (Grand Rapids, MI: Baker Academic, 2008), in Image Journal, Iss. 64 (December 2009): 105–13.
“Modelling Harmony: Music, Theology and Peace-Building” in Interpretation: A Journal of Bible and Theology, 71.1 (January 2017)

Selected chapters
 "Through Music: Sound Mix." In Beholding the Glory: Incarnation Through the Arts, ed. Jeremy Begbie. Grand Rapids: Baker, 2000.
 "Unexplored Eloquencies: Music, Media, Religion and Culture." In Mediating Religion: Conversations in Media, Religion and Culture, eds. Jolyon Mitchell and Sophia Marriage. London: T&T Clark, 2003.
 "Beauty, Sentimentality and the Arts." In The Beauty of God: Theology and the Arts, eds. Daniel J. Treier, Mark Husbands and Roger Lundin. Downers Grove: IVP, 2007.
 "Created Beauty: The Witness of J.S. Bach." In The Beauty of God: Theology and the Arts, eds. Daniel J. Treier, Mark Husbands and Roger Lundin. Downers Grove: IVP, 2007.
 "The Sense of an Ending." In A Place for Truth: Leading Thinkers Explore Life's Hardest Questions, ed. Dallas Willard. Downers Grove: IVP, 2010.
 "The Future: Looking to the Future: A Hopeful Subversion." In For the Beauty of the Church: Casting a Vision for the Arts, ed. W. David O. Taylor. Grand Rapids: Baker, 2010.
 "The Shape of Things to Come?: Wright Amidst Emerging Ecclesiologies." In Jesus, Paul, and the People of God: A Theological Dialogue with N.T. Wright, eds. Nicholas Perrin and Richard B. Hays. Downers Grove: IVP Academic, 2011.
 "Confidence and Anxiety in Elgar's Dream of Gerontius." In Music and Theology in Nineteenth-Century Britain, ed. Martin Clarke. Burlington: Ashgate, 2012.
 '"A Semblance More Lucid"? in An Exploration of Trinitarian Space', in George Westhaver (ed.), A Transforming Vision, London: SCM Press, 2018.
 Begbie, Jeremy. "“There before Us”: New Creation in Theology and the Arts." In The Art of New Creation: Trajectories in Theology and the Arts, edited by Jeremy Begbie, Daniel Train and W. David O. Taylor, Downers Grove, Illinois: IVP, 2022.

References

External links

Duke faculty page
  Duke Initiatives in Theology and the Arts
  Interview with Image Journal

1957 births
20th-century Anglican theologians
20th-century English Anglican priests
21st-century Anglican theologians
21st-century English Anglican priests
Academics of the University of St Andrews
Alumni of Ridley Hall, Cambridge
Alumni of the University of Aberdeen
Alumni of the University of Edinburgh
British Anglican theologians
British classical oboists
British conductors (music)
British male pianists
Duke Divinity School faculty
Living people
Staff of Ridley Hall, Cambridge
Systematic theologians